Vasile Alecsandri National College is a public day high school in Bacău, Romania, located at 37 Vasile Alecsandri Street.

Founded as a secondary school for girls in 1921, work on the building lasted from 1925 to 1934. Today, this is considered a historic monument by Romania's Ministry of Culture and Religious Affairs. In 1954, the institution became coeducational, and in 1959, it was named after poet Vasile Alecsandri. In 2001, it was granted the title of national college.

Notes

External links
 Official site

Educational institutions established in 1921
1921 establishments in Romania
School buildings completed in 1934
Historic monuments in Bacău County
Schools in Bacău County
Bacău
National Colleges in Romania